Cossulus sergechurkini is a moth in the family Cossidae. It is found in Kyrgyzstan.

References

Natural History Museum Lepidoptera generic names catalog

Moths described in 2008
Cossinae
Moths of Asia
Insects of Central Asia